The National Transformation Party may refer to:

National Transformation Party (Trinidad and Tobago)
Rashtriya Parivartan Dal, a political party in India whose name translates as National Transformation Party
the Nation Transformation Party in Papua New Guinea, sometimes referred to as National Transformation Party